Dolany is a municipality and village in Olomouc District in the Olomouc Region of the Czech Republic. It has about 2,800 inhabitants.

Administrative parts
Villages of Pohořany and Véska are administrative parts of Dolany.

History
The first written mention of Dolany is from 1235.

References

Villages in Olomouc District